Novoyermekeyevo (Yañı Yärmäkäy) is a rural locality (a village) in Spartaksky Selsoviet, Yermekeyevsky District, Bashkortostan, Russia. The population was 85 as of 2010. There is 1 street.

Geography 
Novoyermekeyevo is located 19 km south of Yermekeyevo (the district's administrative centre) by road. Pionersky is the nearest rural locality.

References 

Rural localities in Yermekeyevsky District